Saracens Women (/ˈsærəsənz/) are a women's rugby union club based in Hendon, London, England. They were founded in 1989 and currently play in the Premier 15s, the top level competition of women's rugby in the country. Saracens are the most successful team in the history of the Premier 15s, having won the league a record three times – in 2017–18, 2018–19 and 2021–22. They are also the women's team of Saracens Amateurs, who themselves are affiliated to Premiership Rugby team, Saracens.

History 
Saracens Women were originally founded in 1989 by a group of eight players, which included England internationals Emma Mitchell, Janis Ross and Sam Robson, and Wales internationals Amanda Bennett and Liza Burgess. In their debut season, they won the second division and achieved promotion to the Women's Premiership for the 1990–91 season. The team then claimed their first silverware at the national sevens tournament in 1990, and earned a total of 17 trophies over the ensuing decade, including domestic trebles in 1993 and 1998.

Historically, the club has held rivalries with fellow London sides Richmond, Wasps and, in more recent years, Harlequins. In 2006, Saracens won the Women's Premiership. In 2007 they retained their title by going unbeaten through the league season. In 2005, Saracens Ladies II had points deducted for fielding an underage and unregistered player. In 2007, Saracens Ladies II finished second in the league after losing their final game against Bath Ladies after having been unbeaten until that match.

In recent times, Saracens have won the Premier 15s competition in 2018, 2019 and 2022. The club currently field two teams – the First XV in the Premier 15s, and the Development XV in the Premier Development league.

Until 2014, Saracens played their home games at Bramley Sports Ground and occasionally at Vicarage Road – the home of Watford FC – when the Saracens men's team, to whom they are affiliated, moved home fixtures there in 1997. In 2014, Saracens Women reached an agreement to play home matches at the men's home ground, StoneX Stadium, in Hendon. This ground continues to be their home ground for Allianz Premier 15s and A League games.

Current standings

Current squad  

This is the Saracens Women squad for the 2022–23 Premier 15s season:

Note: Players listed in bold have received at least one senior international test cap.

Club officials 
The current Saracens senior management and coaching staff is as follows:

Notable players 
Saracens Women have provided players to the England women's national rugby union team including founder England players Sam Robson, Emma Mitchell, Janis Ross, Jane Mitchell, Fiona Barnet and Welsh international Liza Burgess. England's most capped hooker, Amy Garnett played for Saracens. Maggie Alphonsi, who also was awarded a Member of the Order of the British Empire for services to rugby, played for Saracens Women until her retirement, after winning a league and cup double, in 2015. Lee Adamson coached Saracens Women before leaving to coach the Scotland women's national rugby union team in 2007.

Rugby World Cup 
The following players have been selected to represent their national teams at the Rugby World Cup while at Saracens (winners are listed in bold):

International players 
The following former Saracens players have received at least one international cap for their country's test or sevens team:

  Leslie Cripps
  Sophie de Goede
  Olivia DeMerchant
  Mandy Marchak
  Julia Sugawara
  Emma Taylor
  Maggie Alphonsi
  Karen Andrew
  Katie Ball
  Charlotte Barras
  Ellie Boatman
  Helen Clayton
  Bryony Cleall
  Deborah Fleming
  Rosie Galligan
  Amy Garnett
  Ellena Perry
  Helena Rowland
  Tamara Taylor
  Kerrie-Ann Craddock
  Alev Kelter
  Carly Waters
  Amanda Bennett
  Liza Burgess
  Jade Knight

Club captains 
The following players have held the position of Saracens Women club captain:

 1989–1992 -  Liza Burgess
 1993–1995 -  Katie Ball
 1995–1997 -  Janis Ross
 1997–1998 -  Janice Byford
 1998–2002 -  Claire Frost
 2002–2004 -  Helen Clayton
 2005–2007 -  Leslie Cripps
 2007–2009 -  Amy Garnett
 2010–2012 -  Louise Horgan
 2012–2015 -  Maggie Alphonsi
 2015–2017 -  Sonia Green
 2017–present -  Lotte Clapp

Personnel honours and records

World Rugby Awards 
The following Saracens players have earned recognition at the World Rugby Awards (presented annually since 2001):

Six Nations Championship Awards 
The following players have been named in the Women's Six Nations Player of the Championship or Team of the Championship shortlists while at Saracens:

Premier 15s Awards 
The following Saracens players have been named in the annual Premier 15s awards:

End-of-season club awards 
The following Saracens players have earned recognition at the club's annual Big Bash end-of-season awards:

Club honours

Saracens Women 
Women's Premiership
Champions: (5) 2005–06, 2006–07, 2007–08, 2008–09, 2014–15
Runners–Up: (5) 2003–04, 2009–10, 2011–12, 2013–14, 2015–16
Premier 15s
Champions: (3) 2017–18, 2018–19, 2021–22
Runners–Up: (1) 2020–21

Saracens Women IIs 
Premier 15s Development League
Champions: (2) 2017–18, 2018–19

Saracens Women 7s 
Singha Premiership 7s
Champions (1): 2016

Season summaries  

Gold background denotes championsSilver background denotes runners-upPink background denotes relegated

Notes

References 

Saracens F.C.
Women's rugby union teams in England
English rugby union teams
Rugby clubs established in 1989
Women's sports teams in London
Rugby union clubs in London
Rugby union clubs in Hertfordshire